Elijah Kelley (born August 1, 1986) is an American actor, singer, and dancer. He appeared in films such as 28 Days (2000), Take the Lead (2006), Hairspray (2007), Red Tails (2012), Lee Daniels' The Butler (2013), NBC's live-musical event The Wiz Live! (2015), as Ricky Bell in The New Edition Story (2017), and Star (2017).

Early life
Kelley was born and raised in LaGrange, Georgia. He attended Long Cane Middle School and Troup County High School, where he participated in the school's show choir for years. As a child, he starred in Coca-Cola commercials and played a role in the film Mama Flora's Family. He also performed in a church choir and gospel band with his family. His parents, determined to keep their son down to earth, went with him when he moved to Los Angeles after graduating from high school.

Career
In 2007, Kelley starred in the film adaptation of Hairspray. Both his performance and the film received positive reviews. On December 2, 2011, Kelley sang "The Star-Spangled Banner" prior to the Pac-12 Conference Championship Game at Autzen Stadium in Eugene, Oregon.

In 2015, Kelley was cast in the role of the Scarecrow in NBC's production of The Wiz Live!

He was cast as singer Ricky Bell for the 2017 BET Biography Miniseries The New Edition Story. He was credited for his help in considering Luke James, who is a long time musical associate of his to audition for the producers of the miniseries to be cast as the bandmate Johnny Gill.

In 2017, Elijah was cast alongside Luke James as a recurring role for the 2nd season of Lee Daniels musical drama Star on FOX.

Filmography

Film

Television

Discography

Soundtracks
2007: Hairspray Soundtrack
2008: DisneyMania 6
2008: Sex and the City: Original Motion Picture Soundtrack Vol. 2

Hairspray singles
"Run and Tell That"
"Come So Far"
"Without Love"
"You Can't Stop the Beat"

DisneyMania 6 singles
"He Lives in You"

Semi-Pro
"Shining Star"

References

External links

1986 births
Living people
African-American male actors
American male film actors
Male actors from Georgia (U.S. state)
People from LaGrange, Georgia
20th-century American male actors
American male child actors
21st-century American male actors
American male television actors
American male voice actors
21st-century African-American male singers